The Zeravshan dace (Leuciscus lehmanni) is a species cyprinid fish known from Afghanistan and Uzbekistan.

References 

Leuciscus
Fish of Afghanistan
Fish of Central Asia
Fish described in 1852
Taxa named by Johann Friedrich von Brandt